Maria Curie-Skłodowska University (MCSU) (UMCS) was founded October 23, 1944 in Lublin. It is named in honour of Marie Curie-Sklodowska. Currently the number of students is almost 36,000. The university has 302 professors (157 full professors), 231 habilitated doctors, 826 senior lecturers, and 1829 teachers in total. Total staff is 3628. To meet the growing demand for higher education, the university has established branches in other cities.

Rankings
In 2011 the Polish national daily newspaper Rzeczpospolita ranked the university 11th among Polish public universities (25).

Faculties
Arts
Biology and Biotechnology
Chemistry
Economics
Geosciences and Land Management
Philosophy and Sociology
Humanities
Mathematics, Physics and Computer Science
Pedagogy and Psychology
Political Science and Journalism
Law and Administration
Off-Campus Branch in Pulawy

Notable alumni 
Henryk Cioch (1951–2017), lawyer
Zyta Gilowska (1949–2016), economist and politician
Stanisław Michalkiewicz (born 1947), politician and activist
Maciej Płaza (born 1976), writer and translator
Jarosław Stawiarski (born 1963), politician
Roman Szporluk (born 1933), Ukrainian and American historian, professor emeritus, doctor of historical sciences

Publications
The university publishes the following journals:

Acta Humana
Annales Universitatis Mariae Curie-Sklodowska
sectio A – Mathematica
sectio AA – Chemia (
sectio AAA – Physica
sectio B – Geographia, Geologia, Mineralogia et Petrographia
sectio C – Biologia
sectio F – Historia
sectio FF – Philologiae
sectio G – Ius
sectio H – Oeconomia
sectio I – Philosophia-Sociologia
sectio J – Paedagogia-Psychologia
sectio K – Politologia
sectio L – Artes
sectio M – Balcaniensis et Carpathiensis
sectio N – Educatio Nova
Anuario Latinoamericano – Ciencias Políticas y Relaciones Internacionales
Artes Humanae
Etnolingwistyka. Problemy Języka i Kultury
Folia Bibliologica 
Kultura i Wartości
Lubelski Rocznik Pedagogiczny
Lublin Studies in Modern Languages and Literature
New Horizons in English Studies
Polish Journal of Soil Science
Prima Educatione
Przegląd Prawa Administracyjnego
Res Historica (
Studenckie Zeszyty Naukowe
Studia Białorutenistyczne
Studia Iuridica Lublinensia
TEKA of Political Science and International Relations
Wschód Europy. Studia humanistyczno-społeczne
Zeszyty Cyrylo-Metodiańskie

Botanic Garden

Founded in 1946 and originally apart of the campus of the University. In 1951, a new location of the Garden in Sławinek (a district in Lublin) was approved. In 1958, the University obtained the property rights of  area. It has about 6,500 species of flora growing here, gathered in several area, among others, a rosarium, a branch of water plants and an alpine garden. It also features a reconstructed noble manor house from the second half of 18th century. Between 2012 and 2013, 418 species of moths in total were recorded in the Botanical Garden.

Gallery

References

External links

 
1944 establishments in Poland
Educational institutions established in 1944
Lublin